New Zealand competed at the 1928 Summer Olympics in Amsterdam, Netherlands with a team of four athletes, four swimmers and two boxers. Seven men and three women represented their country, accompanied by four others. The athletes were led by Arthur Porritt, who was the only New Zealand competitor who had attended the previous Summer Olympics in 1924; Porritt would four decades later become New Zealand's 11th Governor-General. The team won one medal; boxer Ted Morgan won gold in the men's welterweight. Excluding Malcolm Champion's gold as part of a combined Australasia team in 1912, this was New Zealand's first Olympic gold medal.

Medallists

Delegation

Arthur Porritt was appointed captain by the New Zealand Olympic Council. Porritt was at the time based in England for tertiary study and was thus in a position to arrange some things in Europe. He also had the advantage that he had attended the previous Summer Olympics, winning the country's only medal. Porritt, a runner, was joined by eight other competitors: four swimmers, three track and field athletes, and two boxers. In total, there were seven men and three women competing for New Zealand. Both the boxer Alf Cleverley and the swimmer Len Moorhouse did not receive financial support by the Olympic Council for their journey to the Games, but had to pay for it themselves. All athletes apart from Porritt (who was already in England) and Moorhouse travelled by the Remuera to England; The main body of the team was farewelled in Wellington by the prime minister, Gordon Coates, and several cabinet ministers.

Moorhouse followed over a month later on the Tamaroa. A New Zealand rowing eight (including the future All Black Hubert McLean) was selected but was unable to travel to the games because of lack of funds.

Harry Amos was appointed Chef de Mission; at the time he was referred to as chairman. His wife acted as chaperon and travelled to the Olympics at their own expense. A masseur from Wellington, C. Dickinson, accompanied the team in an honorary capacity. Swimmer Kathleen Miller, 19 years old at the time, was accompanied by her mother Annie Miller as a chaperone. Therefore, the ten athletes were accompanied by four others to the Olympics.

Athletics

Key
Note–Ranks given for track events are within the athlete's heat only
Q = Qualified for the next round
q = Qualified for the next round as a fastest loser or, in field events, by position without achieving the qualifying target
NR = National record
N/A = Round not applicable for the event
Bye = Athlete not required to compete in round
NP = Not placed

Men
Track & road events

Men
Field events

Women
Track & road events

Boxing

Swimming

Men
Ranks given are within the heat.

Women
Ranks given are within the heat.

References

Official Olympic Reports
International Olympic Committee results database

External links
Photos of Alf Cleverley (boxer) and C Dickinson (trainer-masseur)

Nations at the 1928 Summer Olympics
1928
Summer Olympics